The 2021 Drexler-Automotive Formula 3 Cup was the 40th Austria Formula 3 Cup season and the third Drexler-Automotive Formula 3 Cup season.

Teams and drivers
All Cup cars were built before 2018, Trophy cars were built between 1990 and 2007, and Open class have more powerful engines.

Notes

Race calendar and results 
Round 5 was originally to be held at the Autodromo Enzo e Dino Ferrari, Imola between 16-18th July, but was cancelled by the organiser.

Footnote

Championship standings

Standings for all competitions are shown below. There was no RAVENOL Formel 3 Cup classification for German drivers for this season.

Drexler-Automotive Formula 3 Cup

Drexler-Automotive Formula 3 Trophy

Drexler-Automotive Formula 3 Open

Swiss Formula 3 Cup

References

External links 
Website of the AFR Cups [German]

Austria Formula 3 Cup
Formula 3
Drexler-Automotive F3 Cup
Drexler-Automotive F3 Cup
Drexler-Automotive F3 Cup